Max Nemetz (7 September 1886 – 2 July 1971) was a German film and stage actor. He is best known for the role of the Captain in the 1922 silent film Nosferatu.

Filmography
as actor:

1921: The Graveyard of the Living
1921: Marizza
1921: Nosferatu
1923: Man by the Wayside
1954: Roses from the South
1956: Philemon und Baucis
1963: Stadtpark
1966: Der Fall Rouger
1966: Das Mißverständniss

External links

1886 births
1971 deaths
German male stage actors
German male film actors
German male silent film actors
20th-century German male actors
Actors from Bremen